The men's 4 x 400 metres relay event at the 2003 IAAF World Indoor Championships was held on March 15–16.

Medalists

* Runners who participated in the heats only and received medals.

Note: The United States (James Davis, Jerome Young, Milton Campbell, Tyree Washington) originally won the gold medal in 3:04.09, but were disqualified after Young admitted to the use of banned substances in 2004.

Results

Heats
Qualification: First 2 teams of each heat (Q) plus the next 2 fastest (q) advance to the final.

Final

References
Results

400
4 × 400 metres relay at the World Athletics Indoor Championships